"My 64" is the second single from Mike Jones' extended play The American Dream. It features rappers Bun B and Snoop Dogg. It samples "Boyz-n-the-Hood" by Eazy-E. The radio version doesn't feature Snoop's outro and the last chorus that follows thus the airplay single is 3:55 long.

The video for "My 64" was shot on April 19, 2007 and was directed by John "Dr. Teeth" Tucker. It features the artists driving through Los Angeles. One of the cars used is the same as the one Snoop made his entrance to the Video Music Awards of 2005 in.

"64'"refers to a 1964 Chevrolet Impala, which is pictured on the single cover. The car has long been a favorite of lowrider customizers.

NFL quarterback Vince Young appears in the video, in various scenes riding in the passengers seat of the Impala. Also, where Eazy-E is sampled, his son Lil Eazy-E lip-synches the words to his father's verse.

Track listing
US 12"
"My 64" (Radio Edit) – 3:54
"My 64" (Instrumental) – 5:22
"My 64" (Acappella) – 5:11
"My 64" (Album Version) – 5:11
"Like What I Do" (Radio Edit) – 3:05
"Like What I Do" (Instrumental) – 3:05
"Like What I Do" (Acappella) – 2:52
"Like What I Do" (Album Version) – 3:05

Charts

Remix
"My 64 (Remix)" Feat. The Game, Bun B, and Snoop Dogg from the mixtape You Know What It Is Vol. 4

Music video
Director(s): Dr. Teeth
Production co: The Filming Co.
Rep: Labuda Management

Alex Thomas, Lil' Eazy-E, Lil Rob, Chino XL,  and the bulk of the Ice Age Entertainment roster make cameo appearances in the video. Lil' Eazy-E Lip-Synches the hook in the video.

References

Mike Jones Feat. Bun B & Snoop Dogg - My 64 (Clean)

External links

2006 songs
2007 singles
Mike Jones (rapper) songs
Bun B songs
Snoop Dogg songs
Asylum Records singles
Warner Records singles
Songs written by Snoop Dogg
Songs written by Ice Cube
Songs written by Dr. Dre
Songs written by Mike Jones (rapper)
Songs written by Bun B